Easy Years is a 1953 drama film directed by Luigi Zampa and starring Nino Taranto.

Cast

Nino Taranto as Professor Luigi De Francesco
Clelia Matania as  Rosina, his wife
Giovanna Ralli as  Teresa, his daughter
Gino Buzzanca as   Baron Ferdinando La Prua
Armenia Balducci as   Baroness La Prua
Salvatore Campochiaro as   preside
Flirt Consalvo as   Rosolino Loffredo 
Gabriele Tinti as   Piero Loffredo 
Angiola Maria Faranda as   Teresa Loffredo
Eleonora Tranchina as   Assunta Loffredo
Checco Durante as  doorman Ministero
Gildo Bocci as   usciere al Ministero
Mara Berni as   Vercesi, studentessa procace
Guglielmo Inglese as   capo divisione al Ministero
Aldo Casino as   comm. Larina 
Alda Mangini as   Fedora Larina 
Giovanni Grasso as   Mario Rapisarda
Turi Pandolfini as  the veteran 
Riccardo Billi as  himself
Mario Riva as  himself 
Domenico Modugno as Lawyer Rocco Santoro

References

External links

1953 films
1953 drama films
Films scored by Nino Rota
Italian drama films
1950s Italian-language films
Italian black-and-white films
Films directed by Luigi Zampa
Films produced by Carlo Ponti
Films produced by Dino De Laurentiis
Films set in Sicily
Films set in Rome
1950s Italian films